Century Park station is an Edmonton Light Rail Transit station in Edmonton, Alberta, Canada. It serves the Capital Line. It is a ground-level station located at 111 Street near 23 Avenue, and is named after the transit-oriented development Century Park, located on the former Heritage Mall site next to the station. Century Park is currently the southern terminus of the Capital Line.

The station was officially opened on April 24, 2010, with regular service commencing on April 25, 2010.

Station layout
The station has a 123 metre long centre loading platform that can accommodate two trains at the same time, one on each side of the platform. The platform is exactly nine metres wide. It also has a grade separated pedestrian overpass connecting the platform to the Century Park Transit Centre and the Century Park development. A 1,230 stall park and ride lot adjacent to the station was closed in 2020, with parking now available at Heritage Valley Transit Centre.

Public art
Titled "Continuum", Century Park Station is decorated with three suspended wire spheres covered in maple leaves.

Around the station
Century Park
Blue Quill
Ermineskin
Keheewin
Skyrattler
Steinhauer
Sweet Grass

Century Park Transit Centre

The Century Park Transit Centre is located on the east side of 111 Street, adjacent to the LRT station. The transit centre has climate controlled waiting rooms, public washrooms, a drop off area, park & ride, free parking ended on March 31st, 2020 , a convenience store, a pay phone and covered bicycle parking. It is connected to the station by an elevator-equipped pedestrian overpass which also crosses to the west side of 111 Street and the Blue Quill neighbourhood.

Originally named the "Kaskitayo Transit Centre", the transit centre was renamed to "Heritage Transit Centre" in 2000 and again to "Century Park Transit Centre" in 2009.

The Century Park Transit Centre offers connections to much of South Edmonton, as well as the Edmonton International Airport and the city of Leduc.

The following bus routes serve the transit centre:

The above list does not include LRT services from the adjacent LRT station.

References

External links

Edmonton Light Rail Transit stations
Railway stations in Canada opened in 2010
Edmonton Transit Service transit centres
Capital Line